Peter Cuddon (fl. 1399–1410), of Dunwich, Suffolk, was an English politician.

Family
Cuddon was the son of Peter Cuddon, the brother of Robert Cuddon and father of another Robert Cuddon, all also MPs for Dunwich.

Career
He was elected Member (MP) of the Parliament of England for Dunwich in 1399, and again in 1410.

References

14th-century births
15th-century deaths
English MPs 1399
English MPs 1410
People from Dunwich